Teachers Across Borders is the name used by two non-profit organizations that cooperate to organize professional development opportunities for teachers in developing countries. They currently operate primarily in Cambodia.

Teachers Across Borders (United States) 
Teachers Across Borders was formed in 2002.

Teachers Across Borders (Australia) 
Teachers Across Borders (Australia) Incorporated was formed in 2006.

Teachers Across Borders (Sweden) 
Teachers Across Borders Sweden was formed in 2010 and is currently operating in Burma/Myanmar, Cambodia and Kenya.

Teachers Across Borders (Southern Africa) 
In 2011 an existing program supporting teachers in South Africa and Swaziland became affiliated with TAB.

See also 

Teachers Without Borders

Notes

External links 
 Teachers Across Borders

Educational organisations based in Cambodia
Educational organisations based in South Africa